The Feria de La Línea, (Fair of La Línea in English) also known as La Salvaora or La Velada is a Feria (festival) and one of the most important celebrations in the Spanish municipality of La Línea de la Concepción. 

The Spanish word feria originally designates  a fair (agricultural, books, ...). Bullfights are often given on the occasion of fairs, so the Spaniards came to designate by the term "fair" a series of bullfightings organized on this occasion, and often - especially in Andalusia - the festivities that accompany these bullfights. In many parts of Spain, there are nevertheless still a parting between the festivities and the feria which takes place on this occasion, as is traditional the fair ends with a Bullfight in the La Línea de la Concepción Bullring.

History 
Its origins go back to 1879, 9 years after the town was first founded, the fair began when farmers gathered to sell and buy beautiful animals, usually drinking to celebrate the deals.

Celebration 
Nowadays it is celebrated in the Parque Municipal Reina Sofía and is always celebrated in July.

The Feria is divided in two parts: one is a kind of small village, with streets that have bars and restaurants at both sides (these restaurants are called Casetas). The other is a Theme Park/carnival style area where kids and grown ups can have fun on different rides such as roller coasters, bumper cars etc...

At the Feria de La Línea all the casetas are public, so anyone can just walk into any one and enjoy the food, drinks, and dancing. This is one of the main features that differentiates it from the Seville Fair as most of the "casetas" there are private and therefore only card holding members are allowed in.

In the casetas, throughout the day and night, people will usually be found drinking a traditional drink known as fino sherry, and in more recent years a new trend is to mix the fino with lemonade and ice cubes creating a cocktail commonly known as Rebujito.

At night time there is a sort of "roof" of pretty decorative lights lighting this little "village" like area, which allows the party to last all the way till dawn.

References 

Andalusian culture
Annual events in Spain
Fairs in Spain